Hülya Darcan Korel (born 27 April 1951) is a Turkish actress best known for portraying Hayme Hatun, Ertuğrul's mother, in historical series Diriliş: Ertuğrul from 2014 to 2019. She is the mother of actress Bergüzar Korel and mother-in-law of Halit Ergenç.

Biography 
Her family is of Albanian descent. She is a graduate of high school. In 1967, at the age of 16, she was 3rd in the Ses Mecmuası cover star contest, one of the famous magazines of the era. As a result, she received an offer from the cinema. She played the lead role with Fikret Hakan, Ekrem Bora and Tugay Toksöz in her first film Silahları Ellerinde Öldüler.

She married Tanju Korel, whom she met in 1971, and married in 1974. They had two children, Zeynep, who was born in 1977, and Bergüzar Korel born in 1982.

Filmography

Television
 2021 - Bir Zamanlar Çukurova
 2020 - Şeref Sözü
 2014–2019 - Diriliş: Ertuğrul
 2012 - Dila Hanım
 2012 - Leyla'nın Evi
 2011 - Kalbim Seni Seçti
 2010 - Samanyolu
 2008 - Binbir Gece (guest appearance)
 2007 - Tutsak
 2007 - Vazgeç Gönlüm
 2006 - İyi ki Varsın
 2005 - Zeytin Dalı
 2004 - Büyük Yalan
 2003 - Hırçın Menekşe
 2003 - Baba
 2002 - Zeybek Ateşi
 1995 - Bizim Ev

Films

References

External links 
 
 Hülya Darcan on Kinoturkey.ru
 Hülya Darcan  on 
 

1951 births
Living people
Turkish television actresses
Turkish film actresses
Actresses from İzmir
Turkish people of Albanian descent